Richard Clyde Sawyer is a former pitcher in Major League Baseball who played from 1974 through 1977 for the New York Yankees and San Diego Padres.

Sources
, or Retrosheet
Pelota Binaria (Venezuelan Winter League)

1948 births
Living people
Bakersfield Renegades baseball players
Baseball players from Bakersfield, California
Cal State Northridge Matadors baseball players
Cardenales de Lara players
American expatriate baseball players in Venezuela
Gulf Coast Indians players
Jacksonville Suns players
Major League Baseball pitchers
New York Yankees players
Portland Beavers players
Reno Silver Sox players
San Diego Padres players
San Antonio Brewers players
Syracuse Chiefs players